The 2014 Home United FC season was the 19th season Home United played competed in the S.League. The team also competed in the 2014 Singapore Cup, losing in the finals to Balestier Khalsa 1-3.

Squad

S.League squad

Transfers

Pre-season transfers

In

Out

Mid-season transfers

In

Out

Team statistics

Appearances and goals

Numbers in parentheses denote appearances as substitute.

Competitions

S.League

League table

Matches

Singapore Cup

Home United won 4-1 on aggregate.

Home United won 4-3 on aggregate.

Singapore League Cup

Group A

Matches

Quarter-finals

References

Home United
2014